Farm Fresh may refer to:

Farm Fresh Food & Pharmacy, a grocery store chain in the US state of Virginia,
Farm Fresh Grocery, a drive thru farmstand oriented grocery company in the US State of Texas.
Farm Fresh (band), a Canadian hip hop band.